Higher Downs is a moorland in the parish of Morvah in west Cornwall, England.

References

Moorlands of Cornwall
Penwith